Edwin Edem Okon (born 19 October 1970) is the head coach of Rivers Angels. Born in Cross River State, Okon got a coaching certificate from the sport institute in Lagos State. Following the failure of Nigeria to win the 2012 African Women's Championship, and the subsequent resignation of coach Kadiri Ikhana, Okon was appointed interim head coach of the Super Falcons in 2013.

Nigeria's failure to advance to the knockout-round at the 2015 FIFA Women's World Cup led to the sack of Okon by the Nigeria Football Federation and was replaced by his assistant, Christopher Danjuma on an interim basis.

Honours

Domestic 
As manager of Rivers Angels F.C.

League 
 2012 Nigeria Women Premier League – runners-up 
 2013 Nigeria Women Premier League – runners-up 
 2014 Nigeria Women Premier League – winners 
 2015 Nigeria Women Premier League – winners 
 2016 Nigeria Women Premier League – winners

Cup 
 2012 Federation Cup – winners 
 2013 Federation Cup – winners 
 2014 Federation Cup – winners
 2016 Federation Cup – winners

International 
 2012 FIFA U-20 Women's World Cup – fourth place
 2014 African Women's Championship – winners

References 

1970 births
Living people
Rivers Angels F.C. managers
2015 FIFA Women's World Cup managers
Nigeria women's national football team managers
Nigerian football managers